List of chess openings named after places
 List of foods and drinks named after places
 List of inventions named after places
 List of minor planets named after places
 List of places named after places in the United States
 List of places named after places in the Philippines
 Locations in the United States with an English name

Geography-related lists
Lists of place names